Selenocosmia is a genus of tarantulas that was first described by Anton Ausserer in 1871. The genus is found in China, New Guinea, Indonesia, Australia, Indonesia, Myanmar, Malaysia, Laos, Vietnam, Philippines, India and Pakistan. They are commonly referred to as whistling or barking spiders, due to their ability to stridulate using lyra hairs.

Diagnosis 

In a 2022 paper it was stated that "They can be distinguished from all other tarantula genera by the reduced and shallow apical keel. There is also an absence of dense tufts of retrolateral bristlelike hairs on the tibia and metatarsus of the fourth leg. They stridulate using the maxillae which have lyra hairs, which look somewhat like a scimitar.", citing another article from the previous year. However neither study compare against all Selenocosmia species, therefore it is unknown if this diagnosis holds for all Selenocosmia species.

Species
 the genus contains thirty-six species and four subspecies, found in Asia, Australia, and Papua New Guinea:

 Selenocosmia anubis Yu, S. Y. Zhang, F. Zhang, Li & Yang, 2021 - China
Selenocosmia arndsti (Schmidt & von Wirth, 1991) – New Guinea
Selenocosmia aruana Strand, 1911 – Indonesia (Aru Is.)
Selenocosmia barensteinerae (Schmidt, Hettegger & Matthes, 2010) – Borneo
Selenocosmia compta Kulczyński, 1911 – New Guinea
Selenocosmia crassipes (L. Koch, 1874) – Australia (Queensland)
Selenocosmia deliana Strand, 1913 – Indonesia (Sumatra)
Selenocosmia effera (Simon, 1891) – Indonesia (Moluccas)
Selenocosmia fuliginea (Thorell, 1895) – Myanmar
Selenocosmia hasselti Simon, 1891 – Indonesia (Sumatra)
Selenocosmia hirtipes Strand, 1913 – Indonesia (Moluccas), New Guinea
Selenocosmia honesta Hirst, 1909 – New Guinea
Selenocosmia insignis (Simon, 1890) – Indonesia (Sumatra)
Selenocosmia javanensis (Walckenaer, 1837) (type) – Malaysia to Indonesia (Sulawesi)
Selenocosmia j. brachyplectra Kulczyński, 1908 – Indonesia (Java)
Selenocosmia j. dolichoplectra Kulczyński, 1908 – Indonesia (Java)
Selenocosmia j. fulva Kulczyński, 1908 – Indonesia (Java)
Selenocosmia j. sumatrana Thorell, 1890 – Indonesia (Sumatra)
Selenocosmia jiafu Zhu & Zhang, 2008 – China, Laos
Selenocosmia kovariki (Schmidt & Krause, 1995) – Vietnam
Selenocosmia kulluensis Chamberlin, 1917 – India
Selenocosmia lanceolata Hogg, 1914 – New Guinea
Selenocosmia lanipes Ausserer, 1875 – Indonesia (Moluccas), New Guinea
Selenocosmia longiembola Yu, S. Y. Zhang, F. Zhang, Li & Yang, 2021 - China
Selenocosmia mittmannae (Barensteiner & Wehinger, 2005) – New Guinea
Selenocosmia papuana Kulczyński, 1908 – New Guinea
Selenocosmia peerboomi (Schmidt, 1999) – Philippines
Selenocosmia pritami Dyal, 1935 – Pakistan
Selenocosmia qiani Yu, S. Y. Zhang, F. Zhang, Li & Yang, 2021- China
Selenocosmia raciborskii Kulczyński, 1908 – Indonesia (Java)
Selenocosmia samarae (Giltay, 1935) – Philippines
Selenocosmia similis Kulczyński, 1911 – New Guinea
Selenocosmia stirlingi Hogg, 1901 – Australia
Selenocosmia strenua (Thorell, 1881) – New Guinea, Australia (Queensland)
Selenocosmia strubelli Strand, 1913 – Indonesia (Java, Moluccas) and New Guinea
Selenocosmia sutherlandi Gravely, 1935 – India
Selenocosmia tahanensis Abraham, 1924 – Malaysia
Selenocosmia valida (Thorell, 1881) – New Guinea
Selenocosmia xinhuaensis Zhu & Zhang, 2008 – China
Selenocosmia zhangzhengi Lin, 2022 - China

Formerly included:
Selenocosmia dichromata (Schmidt & von Wirth, 1992)  →  Orphnaecus dichromatus
Selenocosmia hainana Liang, Peng, Huang & Chen → Cyriopagopus hainanus
Selenocosmia himalayana Pocock, 1899 → Haplocosmia himalayana
Selenocosmia huwena Wang, Peng & Xie, 1993 →  Cyriopagopus schmidti
Selenocosmia imbellis (Simon, 1891) → Psednocnemis imbellis
Selenocosmia insulana Hirst, 1909 → Phlogiellus insulanus
Selenocosmia insulana borneoensis Schmidt, 2015 → Phlogiellus insulanus borneoensis
Selenocosmia nigroventris Marx, 1893 → Phoneyusa nigroventris (Nomen dubium)
Selenocosmia obscura Hirst, 1909 → Phlogiellus obscurus
Selenocosmia orophila (Thorell, 1897) → Phlogiellus orophilus
Selenocosmia xinping Zhu & Zhang, 2008 → Phlogiellus xinping

Nomina dubia
Selenocosmia lyra Strand, 1913
Selenocosmia subvulpina Strand, 1907

See also
 List of Theraphosidae species

References

Theraphosidae genera
Spiders of Asia
Spiders of Oceania
Taxa named by Anton Ausserer
Theraphosidae